Léon Pressouyre (27 January 1935 - 10 August 2009) was a French historian of medieval art.

An agrégé of history, he was a member of the École française de Rome (1964–1966). Attached then maître de recherches at the Centre National de la Recherche Scientifique, he was professor of art history and archaeology of the Middle Ages at the University Paris I from 1980 to 1997.

He was permanent advisor of the International Council on Monuments and Sites of the UNESCO (1980–2005).

Léon Pressouyre was a member of the Société des Antiquaires de France.

Bibliography 
1962: Les Origines de la poésie lyrique d'oïl et les premiers trouvères, with M. Cluzel
1981: Le Cloître de Notre-Dame-en-Vaux à Châlons-sur-Marne
1985: L'imaginaire médiéval au cloître de Notre-Dame-en-Vaux
1990: Le Rêve cistercien
1990: Saint Bernard et le monde cistercien
1992: Convention concernant la protection du patrimoine mondial culturel et naturel. Rapport d'évaluation présenté à l'occasion du vingtième anniversaire de la Convention
1994: L'espace cistercien
1995: Pèlerinages et croisades
1995: [dir.] Vivre en moyenne montagne
1996: L'hydraulique monastique
2002: La Commanderie, institution des ordres militaires dans l'Occident médiéval
2007: [dir.] Cité de l'architecture et du patrimoine

External links 
 Journée consacrée à Léon Pressouyre (1936–2009)
 Biographie
 Obituary
 Pressouyre, Léon (1935-2009) on IdRef
 Pressouyre, Léon on Dictionary of Art Historians

20th-century French historians
21st-century French historians
French art historians
Chevaliers of the Légion d'honneur
Officers of the Ordre national du Mérite
Chevaliers of the Ordre des Arts et des Lettres 
People from Bayonne
1935 births
2009 deaths